This is a list of results for the matches played since 1910 by the Catalonia national football team, including unofficial friendly matches against full FIFA international teams, and others against fellow representative teams which are not aligned to FIFA. Catalonia also played many challenge matches against professional clubs including Atlante, Atlético Madrid, Athletic Bilbao, Barcelona, Bologna, Bordeaux, Colo-Colo, Espanyol, Mallorca, Nacional, Real Madrid, Sunderland, Swansea City and Torino,

Since the 1990s, they have concentrated on arranging fixtures likely to improve perception of the team as a full international selection, as opposed to entering competitions for regions such as the CONIFA World Football Cup.

Fixtures and results

Against non-FIFA national/regional teams

Against FIFA national teams

20th century

21st century

Record versus other national teams

Versus non-FIFA teams

Versus FIFA teams

See also
Catalan Football Federation
Catalan football championship
List of Catalan footballers

Notes and references

Notes

References

External links
 
Catalonia (1912–2004) at RSSSF

results
Lists of national association football team unofficial results
national football team results
Spain sport-related lists
National association football team results